Marmoricola ginsengisoli is a Gram-positive, aerobic, non-spore-forming and rod-shaped bacterium from the genus Marmoricola which has been isolated from soil from a ginseng field in Pocheon, Korea.

References

External links 

Type strain of Marmoricola ginsengisoli at BacDive -  the Bacterial Diversity Metadatabase

Propionibacteriales
Bacteria described in 2016